James West Clark (October 15, 1779 – December 20, 1843) was a United States representative from North Carolina. Born in Bertie County to Hannah and Christopher Clark, a successful sea captain and import/export merchant.  James Clark graduated from Princeton College in 1797, was a member of the State House of Commons in 1802, 1803 and 1811, and was a presidential elector on the Madison ticket in 1812. He was a member of the North Carolina Senate from 1812 to 1814 and was elected as a Republican to the Fourteenth Congress, serving from March 4, 1815, to March 3, 1817. Clark was appointed chief clerk of the Navy Department by Secretary John Branch and served from 1829 to 1831.  He resigned his appointment in protest (as did John Branch) as a result of the Petticoat affair (or Peggy Eaton affair), which rocked Washington society and the Jackson administration.

In private life, Clark was a planter, businessman and slave owner.  He owned several hundred acres of lands in North Carolina and at least  in Dyer County, Tennessee.  In 1835 he moved the bulk of his male slaves to Livingston, Alabama, where he made a substantial profit in the slave hire business.  Clark's son, Henry Toole Clark, helped his father manage the family plantations and their local business interests, which included a grist mill and operating a canal.  His son would later become governor of North Carolina during the Civil War from 1861 to 1862.

He died at home in Tarboro, North Carolina, at the age of 64.

References

 Poteat, R. Matthew, Governor Henry Toole Clark: a biography (McFarland Press, 2009).
 
 Poteat, R. Matthew, "A Modest Estimate of His Own Abilities: Governor Henry Toole Clark and Civil War North Carolina," The North Carolina Historical Review, 84 (1) and 84 (2) (January and April 2007)

1779 births
1843 deaths
People from Bertie County, North Carolina
Democratic-Republican Party members of the United States House of Representatives from North Carolina
1812 United States presidential electors
Members of the North Carolina House of Representatives
American planters
American slave owners
People from Tarboro, North Carolina